Gerard du Prie (23 May 1937 – 11 March 2020) was a strongman and powerlifter from Egmond aan Zee  in the Netherlands. He won two world titles in the superheavyweight class (+125 kg) at the World Masters Powerlifting Championships in 1983 and 1986, both times competing in the 40–49 age group. He was the Strongest Man of the Netherlands in 1979 and runner-up in 1982. He finished in eighth place at the 1980 World's Strongest Man competition.

References

1937 births
2020 deaths
Dutch strength athletes
People from Egmond